Mercantile Library may refer to:

 New York Mercantile Library (1820), former name of the Center for Fiction, New York City, New York
 Mercantile Library Association (Boston, Massachusetts) (1820)
 Mercantile Library of Cincinnati (1835), Cincinnati, Ohio, also known as Young Men's Mercantile Library
 St. Louis Mercantile Library (1846), University of Missouri–St. Louis, St. Louis, Missouri
 Mercantile Library Association of San Francisco (1852), San Francisco, California, absorbed by San Francisco Mechanics' Institute in 1906
 Saint Paul Public Library (1857), Saint Paul, Minnesota
 Brooklyn Public Library (1857), Brooklyn Public Library Business Library, New York
 Philadelphia Mercantile Library (1866), Philadelphia, Pennsylvania

See also
 Mercantile
 Library